(Norbornadiene)molybdenum tetracarbonyl is the organomolybdenum compound with the formula (C7H9)Mo(CO)4.  Structurally, the compound consists of the norbornadiene bonded to a Mo(CO)4 fragment.  The compound is a yellow, volatile solid.  It is prepared by thermal or photochemical substitution of molybdenum hexacarbonyl. The compound was originally examined as a potential antiknock agent.

(Norbornadiene)molybdenum tetracarbonyl is a precursor to other derivatives of the type L2Mo(CO)4.  This conversion exploits the lability of the diene ligand:
(C7H9)Mo(CO)4  +  2 L  →   C7H9  +  L2Mo(CO)4

References

Molybdenum(0) compounds
Carbonyl complexes
Octahedral compounds
Diene complexes
Organomolybdenum compounds